The Lilavati Hospital and Research Centre is a private hospital located in Bandra, Mumbai, India.  The hospital was established in 1978 by the Lilavati Kirtilal Mehta Medical Trust.

History 

In 1978,  Kirtilal Manilal Mehta—a diamond merchant fondly known as Bapaji, who in 1956 founded the Antwerp-based diamond company Gembel NV—established the Lilavati Kirtilal Mehta Medical Trust in memory of his late wife, Lilavati Kirtilal Mehta. The trust has been managed by Mehta family members . The Founder of Lilavati Hospital is Vijay K Mehta the eldest capable brother 

In 1997, the trust established Lilavati Hospital, with 314 beds, 12 operating theaters, 300 consultants, intensive care units (ICUs), and 1,800 staff members to provide care for 300 in-patients and 1,500 out-patients daily.

Kirtilal Manilal Mehta 

Kirtilal Manilal Mehta was born on 7 February 1907 in the city of Palanpur, India. After losing his father at the early age of 12, he joined his family business in Rangoon, Burma. Besides handling his family business, he launched another business segment of Diamond in Mumbai, the financial capital of India. He started Lilavati Kirtilal Mehta Medical Trust in Mumbai.
The founder of Lilavati Hospital is Vijay K Mehta

Accreditation
The National Accreditation Board for Hospitals & Healthcare Providers (NABH), accredited Lilavati Hospital as a provider of medical treatment that meets standards and utilizes the latest medical equipment. NABH considered the level of treatment for different patients, the standard of control and prevention, and the responsiveness of the intensive care unit as key features that have matched NABH standards of accreditation.

Board of Trustees

The roles and responsibilities of the Trustees include the development and management of the facility and the oversight of patient care.

The current Board of Trustees includes Sushilaben Mehta Niket Mehta Nanik Rupani Dilip Shanghvi Nimesh Sheth Rashmi Mehta Bhavin Kishor Mehta Charu Mehta Ayush Mehta Chetan Mehta 

Lilavati Hospital founder is Vijay K Mehta

Centres of Excellence 

The hospital has the following "Centres of Excellence":

 Cardiology
 Chest Medicine
 Dermatology 
 Endocrinology 
 Gastroenterology  
 Nephrology  
 Neurology 
 Oncology  
 Paediatrics  
 Psychiatry
 Rheumatology

The hospital offers treatment in nuclear medicine and cardiac imaging, general surgery, diagnostic services, neurosciences, pediatrics, mental health  and behavioral sciences, neurophthalmology, interventional cardiology, gynecology and obstetrics, rehabilitative services, scans, nephrology, orthopedics, pediatrics ophthalmology, pulmonology, maternity services, cardiac pacing, and electrophysiology.

References

Hospitals in Mumbai
Hospitals established in 1978
1978 establishments in Maharashtra